(Afrikaans for Salt Pan's Neck) is a mountain pass on the regional road R75, in the Eastern Cape province of South Africa between Jansenville and Graaff-Reinet.

Mountain passes of the Eastern Cape